Hasanabad Rural District is in Fashapuyeh District of Ray County, Tehran province, Iran. At the National Census of 2006, its population was 5,033 in 1,390 households. There were 4,909 inhabitants in 1,584 households at the following census of 2011. At the most recent census of 2016, the population of the rural district was 2,777 in 903 households. The largest of its 18 villages was Shamsabad, with 1,464 people.

References 

Ray County, Iran

Rural Districts of Tehran Province

Populated places in Tehran Province

Populated places in Ray County, Iran